Francisca de Gutierrez (born 5 May 1944) is a former archer who represented Mexico in archery at the 1972 Summer Olympic Games.

Olympics 

She competed in the women's individual event and finished tenth with a score of 2353 points.

References

External links 
 Profile on worldarchery.org

1944 births
Living people
Mexican female archers
Olympic archers of Mexico
Archers at the 1972 Summer Olympics
Place of birth missing (living people)
20th-century Mexican women